Yangjiang is a prefecture-level city in Guangdong, China.

Yangjiang may also refer to the following towns in China:
Yangjiang, Hainan (阳江), in Qionghai, Hainan
Yangjiang, Jiangsu (阳江), in Nanjing, Jiangsu
Yangjiang, Jiangxi (洋江), in Fenyi County, Jiangxi
Yangjiang, Yunnan (漾江), in Yangbi Yi Autonomous County, Yunnan

See also
Yang Jiang (1911–2016), Chinese dramatist, writer, and translator
Yang River (disambiguation)
Yang Jian (disambiguation)